Esperança Maria Eduardo Francisco da Costa is an Angolan biologist, university researcher-teacher and politician who is currently serving as the 4th Vice President of Angola.

She was deputy list head of the Popular Movement for the Liberation of Angola (MPLA) party for the 2022 Angolan general elections. With the party's victory, she became Vice President of Angola on 15 September 2022.

Biography 

Esperança da Costa was born in Luanda, Angola, on May 3, 1961. In her youth, during the country's decolonization process, she was part of the Youth Movement of the Popular Movement for the Liberation of Angola (JMPLA) and the Organization of Angolan Women (OMA).

Scientific career 
She studied biology at Agostinho Neto University (UAN), graduating in 1985. Between 1983 and 1984, she specialized at the Botany Center of the Tropical Scientific Research Institute in Lisbon, Portugal.

When she returned to Luanda, she was appointed assistant in plant biology at Agostinho Neto University (UAN), becoming head of the biology department in 1986. Between 1986 and 1990, she was responsible for the development of the Luanda Herbarium.

In 1990, she began her master's degree in plant productivity at the Technical University of Lisbon, followed, in 1992, to a doctorate in phytoecology at the same university, completed in 1997.

Upon returning to Angola, she was readmitted as a professor at Agostinho Neto University, becoming director of the Luanda Herbarium and assistant professor of plant biology.

She then served as vice-director of Scientific Affairs and, from 2002, vice-rector for University Expansion at UAN until 2007. Between 2007 and 2010, she was the National Director of the Expansion of Higher Education at the Ministry of Higher Education, supervising the national construction of campuses and new higher education institutions. She acted as director of the UAN Botany Center between 2010 and 2020.

Political career and vice presidency 
She was elected to the Central Committee of the Popular Movement for the Liberation of Angola (MPLA) in 2019, being appointed by President João Lourenço as Secretary of State of Fishing in 2020.

She contested and won the 2022 Angolan general elections as the running mate of João Lourenço. She assumed office as Vice President of Angola on 15 September 2022.

References

MPLA politicians
People from Luanda
Vice presidents of Angola
Angolan scientists
Agostinho Neto University alumni
Living people
21st-century Angolan politicians
21st-century Angolan women politicians
Academic staff of the Agostinho Neto University
Technical University of Lisbon alumni
Year of birth missing (living people)